Syeda Nain Fatima Abidi (born 23 May 1985;) is a Pakistani-American cricketer who played as a right-handed batter. She served as the vice-captain of Pakistan women's cricket team. She appeared in 87 One Day Internationals and 68 Twenty20 Internationals for Pakistan between 2006 and 2018, and in 2012 became the first Pakistani player to score a century in WODIs, scoring 101* against Ireland. She played domestic cricket for Karachi and Zarai Taraqiati Bank Limited.

Background 
Nain Abidi is a Syed, born on 23 May 1985 in Karachi. During her childhood, she trained at Zaheer Abbas Cricket Academy at Karachi. She is coached by Sagheer Abbas, the younger brother of Zaheer Abbas.

Pakistan career

2006
Nain made her international one day debut on 19 December 2006 against India at Jaipur.

2009
She was part of the team at the Women's Cricket World Cup in Australia later that year.

2010
Nain was a member of the gold medal-winning team at the 2010 Asian Games in China.

United States career 
In January 2017, she married Asad and moved to United States of America. After playing in the 2017 Women's World Cup, she took a break from cricket. She returned to Pakistan to play the Development T20 Women's Cricket Championship in 2018. After playing for Pakistan in the 2018 Women's Asia Cup, Abidi took a six-month break to visit her husband working in the United States. In 2019, she and her husband gave birth to their son Abidi. They subsequently settled in United States and Abidi retired from Pakistani cricket. After a two-year gap, she began playing regional tournaments in United States. In April 2021, she said that Pakistan Cricket Board granted her permission to represent United States women's team. She was sponsored by Nabeel Ahmed, a business tycoon and the former vice-president of USA cricket, for the USA National Women's Championship.

References

External links
 

1985 births
Living people
Muhajir people
Cricketers from Karachi
Pakistani women cricketers
Pakistan women One Day International cricketers
Pakistan women Twenty20 International cricketers
American women cricketers
Karachi women cricketers
Zarai Taraqiati Bank Limited women cricketers
Asian Games gold medalists for Pakistan
Asian Games medalists in cricket
Cricketers at the 2010 Asian Games
Cricketers at the 2014 Asian Games
Medalists at the 2010 Asian Games
Medalists at the 2014 Asian Games
Pakistani emigrants to the United States